Hemitripterus is a genus of marine ray-finned fishes, sculpins, belonging to the subfamily Hemitripterinae which is part of the family Agonidae. These fishes are found in the North Pacific and Northwest Atlantic Oceans.

Species
The recognized species in this genus are:
 Hemitripterus americanus (J. F. Gmelin, 1789) (sea raven)
 Hemitripterus bolini (G. S. Myers, 1934) (bigmouth sculpin)
 Hemitripterus villosus (Pallas, 1814)

References

Hemitripterinae
 
Taxa named by Georges Cuvier